K. Hemalata is an Indian woman Marxist politician and Central Committee member of Communist Party of India (Marxist). She is the first National level woman leader in the history of trade unions movement in India

Biography 
Kandikuppa Hemalatha was born in 1951 in Andhra Pradesh, the youngest of four children of Vaikunda Rao and Shankari. She studied in MKCG Medical College and Hospital at Berhampur in Odisha. In 1973, Hemalata joined as a doctor in the 'People’s Clinic' of Puchalapalli Sundarayya at Nellore. Since then she was active in Marxist politics as well as started medical practice in Machilipatnam. She became a municipal councilor in 1987 and in 1995 she quit the medical profession, joined in trade union movement as a whole timer. Hemalata became the State secretary of CITU in Andhra Pradesh. She was also appointed in the post of General secretary of All India Federation of Anganwadi Workers and Helpers for the period from 1998 to 2012. In November 2016 Hemalata was elected as the president of the Centre of Indian Trade Unions (CITU) in its 15th National conference held in Puri. In the 22nd party Congress of CPI(M), she became the member of newly elected Central committee.

References

Living people
Communist Party of India (Marxist) politicians from Andhra Pradesh
Indian women activists
Trade unionists from Andhra Pradesh
Indian women trade unionists
20th-century Indian women politicians
20th-century Indian politicians
Women in Andhra Pradesh politics
1951 births